"The Big Slide" was an American television play broadcast on November 8, 1956, as part of the CBS television series, Playhouse 90.  It was the sixth episode of the first season of Playhouse 90. Red Skelton and Shirley Jones starred in the play about a silent movie star. Skelton was nominated for a Primetime Emmy Award for best performance by an actor. Martin Manulis was the producer, and Ralph Nelson was the director.

Plot
A down-and-out vaudeville comedian, Buddy McCoy, becomes a successful silent movie star, but experiences tragedy in his personal life. May Marley is an alcoholic friend who Buddy tries to help.

Cast
 Red Skelton as Buddy McCoy
 Shirley Jones as May Marley
 Murray Hamilton as Chick Tolliver
 Eddie Firestone as Steve Madden
 Jack Albertson as Al St. George
 Jack Mulhall as Joe Ashley
 Fay Spain as Crystal Vail
 Victor Sutherland as L. K. Zimmer
 Ralph Bellamy - host

Production
Martin Manulis was the producer, and Ralph Nelson directed. Edmund Beloin and Dean Riesner wrote the teleplay.

Skelton was nominated for the Primetime Emmy Award for best performance by an actor. The Emmy was awarded to Jack Palance for another Playhouse 90 production, Requiem for a Heavyweight.

Reception
Television writer Eve Starr called Skelton's performance "one of the most moving, powerful and completely believable dramatic performances I have seen in seven-odd years of watching television. Or any other medium, for that matter."

Another television critic, Mary Cremmen, wrote that even those who do not care for Skelton's comedy "could not deny his greatness as a dramatic actor in 'The Big Slide.'"

In The New York Times, J.P. Shanley wrote that "there was something uncomfortably familiar" in the production and "little in the way of an original story."

Critic Charles H. Sanders wrote that "the plot dragged, and even Skelton failed to liven matters up, though he emoted much better than expected."

References

1956 American television episodes
Playhouse 90 (season 1) episodes
1956 television plays